Church of St. Constantine and St. Helena, located in El Hatillo at the south-east of Caracas. It was donated by the Orthodox Church of Venezuela and the Government of Romania to the Orthodox community living in the capital of Venezuela. The land for its construction was donated by the Mayor. There are only 15 religious temples of its kind in the world and only two of them are outside Romania. It was built by craftsmen from the Maramureș region in Transylvania, it was assembled without nails or metal objects in the structure and it is adorned with religious neo-Byzantine paintings. The bell tower rises more than 30 meters. All the pieces of wood for ceilings and walls, were brought from Romania, according sacred traditions to avoid similarities with the hardware and martyrdoms of the crucifixion.

It was inaugurated in 1999 and took part in the act Teoctist Arăpașu, Patriarch of the Romanian Orthodox Church at that time. It was decorated by Titiana Nitu Popa and Mihaela Profiriu. The structure is intended to be a replica of the wooden church of Șurdești, the highest in Romania.

Gallery

See also
 Eastern Orthodox Church
 Romanian Orthodox Church
 Wooden churches of Maramureș
 Vernacular architecture of the Carpathians
 Romanian Venezuelan

References

Romanian Orthodox church buildings
Eastern Orthodox church buildings in Venezuela
20th-century Eastern Orthodox church buildings
Churches in Caracas
Wooden churches in Venezuela
Tourist attractions in Caracas
Churches completed in 1999
Romanian diaspora
1999 establishments in Venezuela